During their reign of power, the Japanese Imperial Navy utilized many weapons, from their initial formation in 1868 to help defend themselves against rapidly growing neighbors and Western countries, to their ultimate demise in 1945 after Japan surrendered to the Allies in World War II. These weapons consisted of; Rifles, Pistols, Submachine guns, Machine guns, Infantry mortars, Grenades and grande discharges, Light anti-aircraft weapons, Anti-tank weapons, Flamethrower, and Military swords. These weapons were utilized to help build the strength of the Japanese Imperial Navy but also defend and attack against opposing Navies.

Rifles
Type 38 Rifle 
Type 38 Cavalry Rifle 
Type 44 Cavalry Rifle 
Type 97 Sniper Rifle 
Type 99 Rifle 
Type 99 Sniper Rifle
Type I Rifle (Not to be confused with TERA Type 1) 
TERA Rifles (Type 100 Rifle, Type 1 Rifle, Type 2 Rifle)
Arisakas (Rifle)

VZ-24 (rifle)

Pistols
Type 26 9 mm revolver 
Type 14 8 mm Nambu Pistol 
Type 94 8 mm Pistol

Sub machine guns
Bergmann Sub Machine Gun 
Type 100 submachine gun

Machine guns
Type 11 Light Machine Gun 
Type 96 Light Machine Gun 
Type 99 Light Machine Gun 
Type 3 Heavy Machine Gun 
Type 92 Heavy Machine Gun 
Type 1 Heavy Machine Gun

Infantry mortars
Type 11 70mm Infantry Mortar 
Type 94 90 mm Infantry Mortar 
Type 96 150 mm Infantry Mortar 
Type 97 81 mm Infantry Mortar 
Type 97 90 mm Infantry Mortar 
Type 97 150 mm Infantry Mortar 
Type 99 81 mm Infantry Mortar 
Type 2 120 mm Infantry Mortar 
Type 98 50 mm Stick Mortar

Grenades and grenade dischargers
Type 10 Grenade 
Type 91 Grenade 
Type 97 Grenade 
Type 99 Grenade 
Ceramic Grenade
Type 10 Grenade Discharger 
Type 89 Grenade Discharger 
Rifle Grenade Dischargers

Light anti-aircraft weapons
Type 98 20 mm AA-Rapid Fire Anti-Tank Machine Cannon 
Type 2 20 mm AA Machine Cannon 
Type 2 20 mm Twin AA Machine Cannon 
Type 4 20 m Twin AA Machine Cannon 
AA Mine Discharger

Anti-tank weapons
Type 97 20 mm AT Rifle 
Type 99 AT Mine 
Type 2 AT Rifle Grenade 
Type 3 AT Grenade 
Lunge AT Mine
Model 93 Pressure Anti-Tank/Personnel Mine
Model 99 Magnetic Anti-Tank Mine

Flamethrower
Type 100 Flamethrower

Military swords
Type 98 Military Sword

Imperial Japanese Navy
Lists of weapons